Independents' Alliance of Moldova was a political party in Moldova, whose last chairman was Serafim Urechean.

Historic background
During the last ten years the rights of local communities have been constantly violated. This was confirmed by the 400 mayors representing different localities, members of the National Mayors' League, representatives of the Federation of Local and Regional Powers and Association of Gagauz Mayors who gathered to openly oppose the intentions of the Communist governing to destroy the current local public administration system.

Participants to the Mayors' Assembly of the Republic of Moldova addressed an appeal to the President of the country, Chair of the Parliament and Prime Minister. They also reserved themselves the right to ask the Council of Europe to monitor the actions undertaken by the Communist governing in the field of local public administration.

An initiative group was formed including councilors, mayors, and citizens, which set up a socio-political organization aimed to represent the interests of independent mayors and councilors. It was to become a socio-political movement of the citizens associated regardless of nationality and religion, united by patriotic principles, dignity and human rights.

On October 13, 2001, the Founding Congress of the Independents' Alliance of the Republic of Moldova gathered 400 delegates from all the administrative territorial units of the Republic. The congress elected Serafim Urechean, Mayor of the Chişinău Municipality, as the Chair of the Alliance.

The Congress decided not to embrace any classical political platform, but rather decided the Alliance to become a democratically oriented socio-political movement, whose immediate goal would be to run in the upcoming elections within a broad democratic coalition.

Immediately after the Founding Congress, in November - December 2001 the Independents' Alliance of the Republic of Moldova embarked on establishing primary organizations in the territories. The party established ten primary organizations in two counties, 2 primary organizations in Gagauz-Yeri, five organizations in districts and ten in the Chişinău municipality.

Further, Chairs and Deputy Chairs of the county, territorial and local organizations were elected. Those structures would represent the party governing body in the time period between conferences and general assemblies. In addition, the Congress elected Revision and Control Commissions for Alliances' structures at all the levels.

The first Congress of the Independents' Alliance of the Republic of Moldova convened on January 19, 2002, in Chişinău and brought together 1,048 delegates from all over the Republic. At issue was the socio-political situation in the Republic of Moldova as well as Alliance's priorities for the future. The Congress adopted the Manifest "Independents' Alliance of Moldova - Moldova's pro-European project". Further the Congress elected Alliance's governing bodies, approved party symbol and anthem.

On July 19, 2003, IARM decided to suspend its activity and join the Party Alliance Our Moldova.

Defunct political parties in Moldova